Kuppepdavu, is a small town in Karnataka, India, 27 km away from Mangalore city and 340 km away from its State Capital City Bangalore. Bantwal is 15 km away, Moodbidri is 16 km away and Bajpe is 12 km away.

External links
 www.kuppepadavu.com

Cities and towns in Dakshina Kannada district